North Santee is a census-designated place (CDP) in Clarendon County, South Carolina, United States. It was first listed as a CDP prior to the 2020 census with a population of 749.

The CDP is on the southwestern edge of Clarendon County, on the northeast shore of Lake Marion, a reservoir on the Santee River. Interstate 95 crosses Lake Marion at North Santee, with access from Exit 102. U.S. Routes 15 and 301 pass through the CDP as a surface highway, joining I-95 at Exit 102 to cross the lake.

Santee Indian Mound and Fort Watson is a historic site in the north part of the CDP, near the shore of Lake Marion.

Demographics

2020 census

Note: the US Census treats Hispanic/Latino as an ethnic category. This table excludes Latinos from the racial categories and assigns them to a separate category. Hispanics/Latinos can be of any race.

References 

Census-designated places in Clarendon County, South Carolina
Census-designated places in South Carolina